Soskovo is the name of several rural localities in Russia:
Soskovo, Moscow Oblast, a village in Guslevskoye Rural Settlement of Taldomsky District of Moscow Oblast
Soskovo, Oryol Oblast, a selo in Soskovsky Selsoviet of Soskovsky District of Oryol Oblast
Soskovo, Perm Krai, a village in Yusvinsky District of Perm Krai